The Heptasophs was the name of two interrelated fraternal orders based in New Orleans 

Order of Heptasophs
Improved Order of Heptasophs, founded as a split from the above group